Luis Negrón López (April 19, 1909 - September 18, 1991) was a politician from Puerto Rico. Negrón was among the founding members of the Popular Democratic Party (PPD) and served as Senator  and as candidate for Governor of Puerto Rico in the elections of 1968.

Early life and education
Negrón López was born Sabana Grande, Puerto Rico in 1909. He graduated from the University of Puerto Rico at Rio Piedras in 1932. Two years later he received his law degree and dedicated himself to private practice until 1948.

Political career
In 1940, he helped Luis Muñoz Marín and others in the creation of the Popular Democratic Party. In the elections of that year, Negrón was elected Representative to the Puerto Rican Legislature.

In the elections of 1944, Negrón is then elected to Senate of Puerto Rico. He worked closely with then Senate President Muñoz Marín in the implementation of legislation that eventually became the ground work of Operation Bootstrap.

Negrón López was among the members of the Constitutional Assembly that in 1952 drafted the Constitution of Puerto Rico. After that, Negrón continued to serve in the Senate, a post that he held until 1968.

That year, incumbent Governor Roberto Sánchez Vilella had a serious dispute with the leaders of the PPD and was barred from seeking a second term as Governor under the party's insignia. Negrón was then chosen as the new candidate for Governor of Puerto Rico. However, Governor Sánchez had founded a new party, the People's Party, and was also seeking reelection. This caused a division inside the PPD that caused the defeat of both Sánchez and Negrón. Instead, Luis A. Ferré of the New Progressive Party was elected Governor. This was the first electoral defeat ever for the PPD.

Later and death
After the elections of 1968, Negrón retired from public life. Negrón López died on September 18, 1991, when he was 82 years old. He was buried at the Sabana Grande Masonic Cemetery in Sabana Grande, Puerto Rico. The town of Sabana Grande named the high school after him.

External links

|-

1909 births
1991 deaths
20th-century American politicians
Members of the Senate of Puerto Rico
People from Sabana Grande, Puerto Rico
Presidents pro tempore of the Senate of Puerto Rico
Popular Democratic Party members of the House of Representatives of Puerto Rico
Popular Democratic Party (Puerto Rico) politicians
University of Puerto Rico alumni